is a railway station located in Minami-ku, Kyoto, Japan. It serves the JR Kyoto Line (Tōkaidō Main Line) of West Japan Railway Company.

The station was named after Nishiōji Street, which crosses the railway by an underground path beneath the station platforms.

Trains 
Trains of the JR Kyoto Line except special rapid service trains stop at the station, and rapid service trains pass in the morning.

Station facilities 
The tracks run east to west and the station building stands south of the tracks. On the tracks there are two island platforms. One of the platforms is located under the elevated tracks of Tōkaidō Shinkansen. Tracks No. 2 and 3 are for passenger use, with Tracks No. 1 and 4 fenced off as all trains on the outer tracks pass through this station without stopping.

History 
Nishiōji Station opened on 16 September 1938, as a stop of local electric train service, which was extended from Suita Station to Kyoto Station in 1937.

Station numbering was introduced to the station in March 2018 with Nishiōji Station being assigned station number JR-A32.

Barrier-free access construction was completed in March 2020 along with a renovation of the north station entrance.

Surrounding area 
Around the station is an industrial area. Headquarters of Wacoal and Horiba are located near the station. The yard of Kyoto Freight Terminal operated by Japan Freight Railway Company is also adjacent to Nishiōji Station.

Adjacent stations

References

External links 
 Nishiōji Station from jr-odekake.net 

Railway stations in Kyoto Prefecture
Tōkaidō Main Line
Railway stations in Japan opened in 1938